UTC+01:24 is an identifier for a time offset from UTC of +01:24.

History
The time corresponding to that offset was the local mean time at the Warsaw meridian and was also known as Warsaw mean time. 

Since the early nineteenth century, it was commonly used for timekeeping purposes in the lands of the former Polish–Lithuanian Commonwealth.

On 5 August 1915, Warsaw switched to Central European Time, and the rest of Poland followed suit on 31 May 1922.

References

External links
Historia W Aspektach Różnych (26 March 2017) Historia w Aspektach Różnych: Niechciany powrót czasu letniego. (in Polish). Tysol.pl. Archived from the original on 12 June 2018.
 http://article.gmane.org/gmane.comp.time.tz/888/match=europe+warsaw+24+1915 

Time in Poland
UTC offsets